The Arts Management and Technology Laboratory (AMT Lab), formally known as Technology in the Arts and Center for Arts Management and Technology (CAMT) is an applied research center at the Heinz College at Carnegie Mellon University in Pittsburgh, Pennsylvania.  Founded in 1996, CAMT researches ways in which technology can successfully support professionals in arts management and develops solutions to meet critical needs.

External links
AMT Lab web site

Carnegie Mellon University